Tatankaceratops (meaning "Bison horn face") is a controversial genus of herbivorous ceratopsian dinosaur. It is a small chasmosaurine ceratopsian which lived during the Late Cretaceous period (latest Maastrichtian stage) in what is now South Dakota. It is known from a single partial skull which was collected from the Hell Creek Formation, dating to 66 million years ago. Tatankaceratops was described by Christopher J. Ott and Peter L. Larson in 2010 and the type species is Tatankaceratops sacrisonorum. Tatankaceratops is known from one specimen housed at the Black Hills Institute, BHI 6226.

In 2011, Nick Longrich published a paper containing a brief re-evaluation of Tatankaceratops. Longrich suggested that Tatankaceratops appeared to possess a bizarre mix of characteristics from adult and juvenile Triceratops specimens; the animal's small size and short, slender brow horns are consistent with the animal being a juvenile, but the gnarled bone and fusion of skull elements to one another are typical of old adult ceratopsians. The elongate nose horn meanwhile was characteristic of Triceratops, and specifically, the highly advanced Triceratops prorsus. Longrich noted that this animal could represent a dwarf species of Triceratops or simply a Triceratops specimen with a developmental disorder which caused it to stop growing prematurely. Other paleontologists, including Thomas R. Holtz, Jr., have written that they "strongly suspect" Tatankaceratops is merely a juvenile specimen of Triceratops. Authors of subsequent studies involving triceratopsins have not considered Tatankaceratops a valid genus.

Systematics
The cladogram below follows Ott and Larson (2010).

See also

 Timeline of ceratopsian research

References

Chasmosaurines
Late Cretaceous dinosaurs of North America
Fossil taxa described in 2010
Hell Creek fauna
Paleontology in South Dakota
Controversial dinosaur taxa
Maastrichtian genus first appearances
Maastrichtian genus extinctions
Ornithischian genera